Club Deportivo Mosconia is a football team based in Grado in the autonomous community of Asturias. Founded in 1961, it plays in the Tercera División RFEF – Group 2. Its stadium is Marqués de La Vega de Anzo with a capacity of 4,100 seats.

History
The first CD Mosconia was founded in 1945 and dissolved in 1956. The current team was founded in 1961 under the name of Grado Club de Fútbol, used until 1970 when the club changed its denomination to the one used currently.

In 1991, Mosconia achieved its biggest success by promoting to Segunda División B after beating Real Madrid C, Bergantiños FC and Atlético Burgalés in the promotion play-offs. It only remained one season in the third tier.

In 2011 the club was relegated to Primera Regional, sixth tier, its worst result ever. After a serious financial trouble, the supporters helped the club to avoid the dissolution and to come back, years later, to Tercera División.

Season to season

1 season in Segunda División B
28 seasons in Tercera División
1 season in Tercera División RFEF

Notable former players
 Alejandro Vázquez
 Roberto Aguirre

References

External links
Official website
BDFutbol profile

Football clubs in Asturias
Association football clubs established in 1961
1961 establishments in Spain